The Expansion Joint Manufacturers Association is an organization of metal bellows expansion joint manufacturers. It was founded in 1955 to create and maintain a set of standards for quality expansion joint design and manufacturing. The EJMA standards are used worldwide as a reference for the proper selection and application of metallic bellows expansion joints. The standards are a combination of a variety of expansion joint manufacturers' knowledge and experience.

The EJMA organization performs extensive technical research on a variety of topics concerning the design and manufacturing of expansion joints. This knowledge contributes to providing new versions of the EJMA book of standards.

Members
The current members that are a part of the Expansion Joint Manufacturers Association include:

AEROSUN-TOLA Expansion Joint Co. Ltd.
American BOA, Inc.
Badger Industries, Inc.
EagleBurgmann EJS
Flexider
Hyspan Precision Products, Inc.
Idrosapiens S.r.l.
KE-Burgmann EJS
MACOGA, S.A 
Microflex, Inc.
Senior Flexonics Pathway
SFZ, S.A.
Teddington Engineered Solutions Ltd.
US Bellows, Inc.
WahlcoMetroflex, Inc.
Witzenmann GmbH
UnisonHKR Co., Ltd. (South Korea) - https://www.unisonhkr.co.kr:40012/
Teadit Juntas Ltda.

References

External links
 Official EJMA Site
 Metal Expansion Joint Pressure Thrust – http://oakridgebellows.com/metal-expansion-joints/metal-expansion-joints-in-one-minute/part-2-pressure-thrust (1 minute)
Metal Expansion Joint Anchors and Guides - http://oakridgebellows.com/metal-expansion-joints/metal-expansion-joints-in-one-minute/part-3-anchors-guides (1 minute)

See also
 Expansion joint

Organizations established in 1955
1955 establishments in the United States